José Antonio Pascual Rodríguez (born 29 March 1942, Monleras, Salamanca) is a linguist and professor of the Spanish language at Charles III University of Madrid, and a member of the Royal Spanish Academy and Accademia della Crusca, the regulatory institutions of standard Spanish and Italian, respectively. He joined the Royal Spanish Academy in 2002, serving as its vicepresident from 2007 to 2015, and is best known for his work with Joan Coromines on the Diccionario crítico etimológico castellano e hispánico (published 1983-1991), as well as the television series Hablando claro aired in Spain in the late 1980s.

References 

1942 births
People from Salamanca
University of Salamanca alumni
Academic staff of the University of Seville
Academic staff of the Charles III University of Madrid
Linguists from Spain
Historical linguists
Linguists of Spanish
Members of the Institute for Catalan Studies
Members of the Royal Spanish Academy
Living people